Pine Creek is a stream in the U.S. state of South Dakota. It is a tributary of Little White River.

Pine Creek was named for the pine trees lining its course.

See also
List of rivers of South Dakota

References

Rivers of Mellette County, South Dakota
Rivers of South Dakota